Isaac Munroe St. John (November 19, 1827 – April 7, 1880) was a Confederate States Army  brigadier general during the American Civil War. He was a lawyer, newspaper editor and civil engineer before the Civil War and a civil engineer after the Civil War. As a civil engineer, he worked for the Baltimore and Ohio Railroad Company (mainly in Maryland) and the Blue Ridge Railroad Company in South Carolina before the Civil War. After the war, he worked for the Louisville, Cincinnati and Lexington Railroad in Kentucky; the city of Louisville, Kentucky; and the Chesapeake and Ohio Railway Company (mainly in Virginia and West Virginia).

Early life
Isaac M. St. John was born on November 19, 1827 in Augusta, Georgia. He moved to New York, New York with his parents, Isaac Richards St. John and Abigail Richardson Munroe St. John, and attended Poughkeepsie Collegiate School. He graduated from Yale University in 1845 and became a lawyer. In 1847, St. John became the editor of the Baltimore Patriot. He was a civil engineer with the Baltimore and Ohio Railroad Company between 1848 and 1855. He then moved to South Carolina where he became a civil engineer  and chief of construction for the Blue Ridge Railroad Company between 1855 and 1861.

American Civil War service
Isaac M. St. John began the Civil War as a private in the Fort Hill Guards of South Carolina in April 1861. By October 3, 1861, he was an engineer in the Army of the Peninsula. By April 1862, he was Brigadier General John B. Magruder's chief engineer at Yorktown, Virginia in the Peninsula Campaign with the rank of captain. On April 18, 1862, St. John became the Chief of the Bureau of Nitre and Mining, an assignment which he held until February 16, 1865. In this position, he produced crucial ordnance supplies, including gunpowder and metals, for the Confederate Army, even as the Union blockade of Southern ports became increasingly effective. Among other things, he found limestone caves containing saltpeter in the southern Appalachian Mountains. He was appointed major, CSA artillery, September 26, 1862 and lieutenant colonel, CSA, Nitre and Mining Corps, May 28, 1863.

St. John resigned from the Nitre and Mining Bureau on January 31, 1864 because the Confederate Senate accused him of protecting draft dodgers. His resignation was refused and the charge was proven untrue. He was promoted to colonel on June 15, 1864.

On February 16, 1865, by special act of the Confederate Congress, St. John was promoted to brigadier general and was appointed commissary general of subsistence because of his procurement skills. He relieved some supply problems through direct acquisitions but his innovations came too late in the war to make a significant impact.

St. John was paroled at Thomasville, Georgia about June 1, 1865 and was promptly pardoned on June 19, 1865, after having taken the oath of amnesty on June 18.

Aftermath
After the war, St. John was chief engineer for the Louisville, Cincinnati and Lexington Railroad from 1866 to 1869. Then, he was city engineer for two years with city of Louisville, Kentucky. He became a civil engineer for the Chesapeake and Ohio Railway and ultimately the head of its Mining and Engineering Department.

Isaac Munroe St. John died April 7, 1880 at The Greenbrier at White Sulphur Springs, West Virginia. He is buried at Hollywood Cemetery, Richmond, Virginia.

See also

List of American Civil War Generals (Confederate)

Notes

References
 Boatner, Mark Mayo, III. The Civil War Dictionary. New York: McKay, 1988. . First published 1959 by McKay.
 Eicher, John H., and David J. Eicher, Civil War High Commands. Stanford: Stanford University Press, 2001. .
 Hall, James O. "St. John, Isaac Munroe" in Historical Times Illustrated History of the Civil War, edited by Patricia L. Faust. New York: Harper & Row, 1986. .
 Heidler, David S. and Jeanne T. Heidler. "St. John, Issac Munroe." In Encyclopedia of the American Civil War: A Political, Social, and Military History, edited by David S. Heidler and Jeanne T. Heidler. New York: W. W. Norton & Company, 2000. . pp. 1846–1847.
 McPherson, James M. Battle Cry of Freedom: The Civil War Era. Oxford History of the United States. New York: Oxford University Press, 1988. .
 Sifakis, Stewart. Who Was Who in the Civil War. New York: Facts On File, 1988. .
 Thomas, Emory M. The Confederate Nation, 1861–1865. New York: Harper & Row, 1979. ..
 Warner, Ezra J. Generals in Gray: Lives of the Confederate Commanders. Baton Rouge: Louisiana State University Press, 1959. .

1827 births
1880 deaths
Confederate States Army brigadier generals
People of South Carolina in the American Civil War